Pascall Fox is an Australian TV presenter best known as the host of the children's television series Wonder World! in the early 1990s. She was also a presenter on the Australian edition of Ground Force, and the Australian edition of Your Life on the Lawn, both in the early 2000s.

References

Australian women television presenters
Year of birth missing (living people)
Living people
Place of birth missing (living people)
21st-century Australian women